Mokrice Castle is a medieval castle southeast of Brežice, Slovenia, located on a hill in the northern part of the settlement of Rajec in the Gorjanci Hills, near the Croatian border. First mentioned in 1444, it was rebuilt in the 16th century and in 1941. The castle belonged to many noble families, the most important being Erdődy and Auersperg. After World War II it was made into a hotel with restaurants and in 1988 a golf course was built in the grounds to the castle. In the same year English pop band the Pet Shop Boys used this castle to film the video for their single "Heart".

References

External links
Official site

Municipality of Brežice
Castles in Lower Carniola
Houses completed in 1941
Hotels in Slovenia
Golf clubs and courses in Slovenia
20th-century architecture in Slovenia